The Hilton Lexington/Downtown is a 240 feet (73 m), 22-story multi-use skyscraper in Downtown Lexington, Kentucky. Floors 1 through 17 comprise the 366-room hotel, while floors 18 through 22 are privately owned condominiums.

History
The hotel constructed by the Webb Companies beginning in 1978 and was completed in 1982 as the Radisson Plaza Hotel Lexington. The hotel left Radisson in August 2008 and briefly operated as the Lexington Downtown Hotel & Conference Center during renovations until October 14, 2009, when it was renamed Hilton Lexington/Downtown.

References

Skyscrapers in Lexington, Kentucky
Lexington Downtown
Hotels established in 1978
Hotel buildings completed in 1978
Skyscraper hotels in Kentucky
1978 establishments in Kentucky